Delton Stevano (born September 16, 1992) is an Indonesian footballer who currently plays for Villa 2000 in the Liga Indonesia Premier Division as a defender.

Club statistics

References

External links

1992 births
Association football defenders
Living people
Sportspeople from Jakarta
Minahasa people
Indonesian footballers
Indonesian Premier Division players
Liga 1 (Indonesia) players
Persija Jakarta players